The present country of Tanzania, officially the United Republic of Tanzania, was created upon the union of the formerly independent countries of Tanganyika and the People's Republic of Zanzibar (P.R.Z.).

Tanganyika became independent from the United Kingdom (U.K.) on December 9, 1961. The United States (U.S.) immediately recognized the new nation and moved to establish diplomatic relations. The U.S. embassy in Dar es Salaam opened on the day of Tanganyika's independence. William R. Duggan served as the chargé d'affaires ad interim pending the appointment of an ambassador.

The Sultanate of Zanzibar became independent from the U.K. on December 19, 1963, as a constitutional monarchy headed by its sultan. The U.S. established an embassy in Zanzibar on December 10, 1963, with Frederick P. Picard III serving as chargé d'affaires ad interim. In January 1964, the sultan was overthrown and the P.R.Z. was established. 

On April 26, 1964, Tanganyika united with the P.R.Z. to form the United Republic of Tanganyika and Zanzibar (U.R.T.Z.). The U.S. ambassador to Tanganyika, William Leonhart, immediately became the ambassador to the U.R.T.Z. A U.S. ambassador to the P.R.Z. had not yet been appointed when that country united with Tanganyika. In lieu of an ambassador, Frank C. Carlucci III was serving as the chargé d'affaires ad interim and continued in that capacity until the U.S. embassy was downgraded to a consulate general on June 27, 1964.

The country was renamed the United Republic of Tanzania on October 29, 1964.

The U.S. did not have an ambassador to Tanzania from October 2016 to August 2020.

Ambassadors

See also
Tanzania–United States relations
Foreign relations of Tanzania
Ambassadors of the United States

Notes

References
United States Department of State: Background notes on Tanzania

External links
 "Chiefs of Mission for Tanzania", Office of the Historian, United States Department of State
 "Tanzania", Bureau of African Affairs, United States Department of State
 U.S. Embassy in Tanzania

Tanzania
Main
United States